Marcq may refer to:


Places

Belgium
 Mark (Dender), a river tributary of the Dender
 Marcq, Wallonia, a village and former municipality in Enghien, Belgium

France
 Marcq, Ardennes
 Marcq, Yvelines
 Marcq-en-Barœul, Nord
 Marcq-en-Ostrevent, Nord

People with the surname
 Damien Marcq, French footballer

See also